Liza Cody (born 11 April 1944, in London) is an English crime fiction writer.

Career
Before she began writing, Cody worked mostly in the visual arts, including as a graphic designer, but she also made furniture and was employed by Madame Tussaud's waxwork museum as a hair inserter and colouring artiste. 

Cody launched her first book in 1980, publishing regularly until 2000, and resuming in 2011.  She is, as of 2022, the author of 16 novels and many short stories. Most of her work is set in London. Her Anna Lee series introduced the professional female private detective to mystery fiction. The entire Anna Lee series was loosely adapted for television and broadcast in both the U.K. and the U.S.

Cody is also the author of the Bucket Nut Trilogy, featuring professional wrestler Eva Wylie, as well as the stand-alone novels Rift, Gimme More, Ballad of a Dead Nobody, Miss Terry, and Gift or Theft. Gimme More and Ballad of a Dead Nobody reflect the author's interest and experience in the world of music and musicians. Miss Terry is a thriller dealing with issues about the children of immigrant families in modern Britain. Gift or Theft is her take on the Gothic novel. Cody has also written a two-book series about a homeless woman: Lady Bag and Crocodiles and Good Intentions: further adventures of Lady Bag.

Cody's novels have been widely translated and as of 2023 remain in print. Her short stories have appeared in numerous anthologies and magazines. A widely praised collection of her first seventeen was published as Lucky Dip and other stories in 2003, reprinted in 2016. Her stories since then were published as My People and other crime stories in 2021

Personal life
As of 2022, she lives in Bath, England, and has a daughter and two grandchildren. Her website, LizaCody.com, includes more information about her work as well as pictures and a blog. She is also a founder member of a small NGO in the Busiiro region of Uganda whose mission is to keep young girls in education instead of early marriage or prostitution.

Awards and honours
Awards include the John Creasey Memorial Prize and the CWA Silver Dagger in the UK as well as an Anthony Award in the U.S. and a Marlowe in Germany. She has twice been nominated for the MWA's Edgars.

Books

The Anna Lee series
Dupe (1980)
Bad Company (1982)
Stalker (1983)
Head Case (1985)
Under Contract (1986)
Backhand (1991)

The Eva Wylie series
Bucket Nut (1992)
Monkey Wrench (1994)
Musclebound (1997)

The Lady Bag books
Lady Bag (2013)
Crocodiles and Good Intentions (2018)

Stand alone novels
Rift (1988, Scribner; Collins in the UK)
Gimme More (2000, Bloomsbury)
Ballad of a Dead Nobody (2011)
Miss Terry (2012)
Gift or Theft (2020)

Short story collections
Lucky Dip and other stories (Crippen & Landru, 2003) (CreateSpace, 2016)
My People and other crime stories (Gatekeeper Press, 2020)

References

External links
 author's website

1944 births
Living people
British crime writers
Anthony Award winners
English mystery writers
Women mystery writers
English women novelists